Clive Page (25 May 1894 – 1 July 1967) was an Australian cricketer. He played in one first-class match for Queensland in 1921/22.

See also
 List of Queensland first-class cricketers

References

External links
 

1894 births
1967 deaths
Australian cricketers
Queensland cricketers
Sportspeople from Rockhampton
Cricketers from Queensland